R17 or R-17 may refer to:

Vessels 
 , an aircraft carrier of the Royal Australian Navy
 , also HMS Valentine (R17), a destroyer of the Royal Canadian Navy and Royal Navy
 , a submarine of the United States Navy

Other uses 
 R17 (New York City Subway car)
 R17 (Rodalies de Catalunya), a regional rail service in Catalonia, Spain
 R-17 (TV series), a 2001 Japanese TV series
 BMW R17, a motorcycle
 ISO Recommendation R17, concerning preferred numbers
 Oppo R17, a smartphone
 R17: Spontaneously flammable in air, a risk phrase
 R-17 Elbrus, a Soviet ballistic missile
 R-17 regional road (Montenegro)
 Renard R.17, a Belgian civil utility aircraft
 Renault 17, a French car
 Rubik R-17 Móka, a Hungarian glider